Bakai (formerly ) was a hamlet, located in Kėdainiai district municipality, in Kaunas County, in central Lithuania. It was 3 km from Kėdainiai, among Varėnai, Tubiai, Janušava and Skirstynė (now Keleriškiai) villages.

History 
As for 1902 its population was 29, as for 1923 - 38. 

On 27 October, 1971 Bakai hamlet was liquidated.

Demography

References

Kėdainiai District Municipality
Former populated places in Lithuania